Nadezhdovka is a rural locality (a selo) in Alexeyevsky District, Belgorod Oblast, Russia. The population was 1 as of 2010.

Geography 
Nadezhdovka is located 86 km east of Alexeyevka (the district's administrative centre) by road. Palenin is the nearest rural locality.

References 

Rural localities in Alexeyevsky District, Belgorod Oblast
Biryuchensky Uyezd